The Copa Confraternidad, was a friendly football match realized between the national teams of Argentina and Brazil, on December 2, 1923, a week before the 1923 edition of Copa Roca.

As at that time trips between Brazil and Argentina were carried out by train, which resulted in long and exhausting journeys, it was a common practice to have more than one game played per tour. Some friendlies involved trophies in the dispute of the games to honor the opposing team.

This was the thirteenth time that Argentina and Brazil faced each other.

Match details

See also
 Argentina–Brazil football rivalry

References  

Argentina–Brazil football rivalry
Argentina national football team matches
Brazil national football team matches
International association football competitions hosted by Argentina
Defunct international association football competitions in South America
Football in Buenos Aires